Leutnant Wolfgang Güttler was a World War I flying ace credited with eight aerial victories. He would score the first four while flying with Jagdstaffel 24, and the last four while flying as commander of Jagdstaffel 13. He was killed in a midair collision over his home airfield on 20 February 1918.

Biography

Wolfgang Güttler was born in Reichenstein on 22 February 1893. At the start of World War I, he served with the Jäger-Bataillon Nr. 11 (11th Jaeger Bataillon), and won a Second Class Iron Cross. He then transferred to the Die Fliegertruppen (Imperial German Air Service).

After training as a pilot, Güttler was posted to Feldfliegerabteilung (Field Flier Detachment) 72 on the Eastern Front in 1916. He later served with Fliegerabteilung (Artillerie)|Feldflieger Abteilung (Field Flier Detachment) 285. During this time, he was awarded the First Class Iron Cross in November 1916.

He then underwent single-seater fighter training at  Fliegerersatz-Abteilung (Replacement Detachment) 11. He was then posted to a fighter squadron, Jagdstaffel 24, on 10 March 1917. He scored his first aerial victory on 2 May 1917, when he shot down a Nieuport 17 south of Bienes. By 9 August, he had shot down a Spad VII and two Sopwith Triplanes of 10 Naval Squadron RNAS.

On 29 September 1917, he was posted to Jagdstaffel 13 to command it as its Staffelführer (C.O.). He scored his fifth victory on 20 October 1917; on 19 February he scored his eighth. The following day, Wolfgang Güttler was engaged in aerial combat over Jagdstaffel 13's home aerodrome at Reneuil Ferme when he collided with another German pilot and was killed in action.

Endnotes

References
 Franks, Norman; Bailey, Frank W.; Guest, Russell. Above the Lines: The Aces and Fighter Units of the German Air Service, Naval Air Service and Flanders Marine Corps, 1914–1918. Grub Street, 1993. , .

1893 births
1918 deaths
Aviators killed in aviation accidents or incidents in France
German military personnel killed in World War I
German World War I flying aces
Luftstreitkräfte personnel
Prussian Army personnel
Recipients of the Iron Cross (1914), 1st class